Berkeleyside is a digital newspaper founded in 2009. It covers life and politics in contemporary Berkeley, California, reporting on politics, schools, crime and business, as well as the food scene in the East Bay.

Business 
Berkeleyside has two main revenue sources: membership and advertising. For six years, from 2013 to 2018, it held an annual ideas festival, called Uncharted: the Berkeley Festival of Ideas.

In 2016, Berkeleyside became the first news site in the U.S. to launch a direct public offering, offering up to $800,000 in preferred stock to California residents. The direct public offering closed in 2018, after Berkeleyside raised $1 million from more than 350 readers. In 2017, Berkeleyside received a $60,000 grant from the Lenfest Institute to teach other news organizations how to launch a direct public offering.

History 
Berkeleyside was founded by Frances Dinkelspiel, Lance Knobel and Tracey Taylor in response to the cutbacks in local news that affected the Bay Area. All three worked as journalists before starting the site. Frances Dinkelspiel is also the author of two books, Tangled Vines: Greed, Murder, Obsession and an Arsonist in the Vineyards of California, from 2015, and Towers of Gold: How One Jewish Immigrant Named Isaias Hellman Created California, from 2008.

Berkeley is a city of 120,000 residents. Its culture and politics are heavily influenced by the presence of the University of California, Berkeley, campus in the center of the city. Berkeleyside takes as its premise the idea that Berkeley has had an outsized influence on the culture of the United States. Berkeleyside's coverage reflects the notion that Berkeley is a city of cutting-edge ideas and technologies that is frequently in the forefront of political discourse.

Awards 
Berkeleyside has received numerous awards for its reporting. In both 2013 and 2014, the Northern California Chapter of the Society of Professional Journalists gave Berkeleyside an Excellence in Journalism award for its community journalism. In 2016, the same organization gave Emilie Raguso, senior reporter, and Frances Dinkelspiel an award in explanatory journalism for their comprehensive coverage of homelessness in Berkeley. In 2017, SPJ NorCal named Emilie Raguso the “Journalist of the Year.”

In 2017, the San Francisco Press Club gave Berkeleyside first place in the digital media division for “Overall Excellence,” along with awards for breaking news, coverage of Berkeley's November 2016 election, and other stories.

References

Mass media in Berkeley, California
Newspapers published in the San Francisco Bay Area